Toro is the name of two fictional characters appearing in American comic books published by Marvel Comics. The first Toro was originally featured in Timely Comics and later published as a Marvel Comics superhero who appeared as the partner of the original Human Torch.

Publication history
The first Toro made his debut in Timely Comics' Human Torch Comics #2 (premiering fall 1940 with no cover date and as issue #2, having taken over the numbering from the single-issue Red Raven). Toro appeared in numerous comics titles in the 1940s, both during World War II and the post-war era. He starred with Bucky in Young Allies Comics, and made appearances in various issues of Kid Comics, Amazing Comics, Complete Comics, Mystic Comics, All-Winners Comics, and Sub-Mariner Comics. In 1948, however, the Human Torch dropped Toro as a sidekick, picking up with Sun Girl instead.

Toro and the Torch later appeared in Atlas' Young Men #24 (December 1953). Toro also made several appearances in Marvel Comics titles, beginning with reprints of Human Torch stories in Marvel Super-Heroes #12–14 (Dec. 1967-May 1968), followed by a previously unpublished Atlas-era Human Torch story in #16 (Sep. 1968).

Toro appeared in a new story in Prince Namor, The Sub-Mariner #14 (June 1969) where he was seemingly killed off. He subsequently appeared in flashbacks and historical stories, being a regular character in the 1970s Invaders series. After years of only appearing in flashback stories, he returned to current publication with the 2008 Avengers/Invaders maxiseries and the 2009 miniseries The Torch.

In 2014, as part of Marvel Now! the All-New Invaders were relaunched and a flashback story was told about Toro during WWII in issues #6–7 and it is revealed Toro is an Inhuman in issue #10.

Fictional character biography

Thomas Raymond

Thomas Raymond was born in New York City to parents who were laboratory assistants to Phineas Horton, creator of the original Human Torch. After their employment with Horton had ended, they were killed in a train derailment. Toro himself was found at the site of the accident by a traveling circus completely unscathed despite the blaze from the wreckage raging around him. He was found to have a natural immunity to fire. Adopted by the circus, his complete immunity to flame was used to draw additional crowds to the circus sideshow.

Eventually the circus is visited by the Human Torch, and as he draws closer to Toro the younger man's flame powers fully erupt for the first time. The Human Torch teaches Toro how to control his flame powers, and from this point onward, Toro becomes a protégé and partner of the Torch. He later becomes a co-founder of the Invaders.

Toro is the only member of the Invaders to survive the war mentally and physically intact. He marries Ann Raymond and assumes a pedestrian life, until he's killed in battle with the Mad Thinker years later, destroying the Thinker's laboratory in the process. Toro's body is never recovered.

Toro's wife Ann Raymond appears three more times after his death. First, in Power Pack #56 – 62, she appears and a "Mr. Raymond" also appears, who can flame on, but is apparently trying to hide his identity from the world; this is never fully explained as the series ended (this story also heavily implied Frankie Raye was Mr. Raymond's daughter). Next, Ann Raymond appears sporadically in Avengers West Coast #48 – #65, befriending the original Human Torch after his body is dug up and reactivated. Later, in Namor #8 – #12, Ann Raymond, who is now romantically involved with the Torch, accompanies him when he saves Spitfire's life through a blood transfusion—returning her to her youth in the process. Since the West Coast Avengers and Namor storylines, Ann Raymond (and for that matter "Mr. Raymond") are not seen again, until Torch #1, in which Toro is shown staring into her window from a rooftop as she snuggles on the couch with a man the Golden Age Vision refers to as her new husband. The Vision tells Toro that he needs to move on with his life.

Toro appears in the Avengers/Invaders maxi-series alongside his fellow Invaders when an incident takes them from the battlefields of WW2 to the present Marvel Universe, where they encounter both the New Avengers and Mighty Avengers and the Thunderbolts. An examination of him by S.H.I.E.L.D. agents reveals that Toro is a mutant. In Avengers/Invaders #12, Toro is revived from the dead by the Cosmic Cube thanks to a wish made by James "Bucky" Barnes, and met as he rises from his grave by the Golden Age Vision. Bucky is careful to manage the wish so Toro's revival does not upset the time stream, Toro only coming to life after the Invaders have returned to the past. Toro is the same age he was when he died.

Thomas "Toro" Raymond is the protagonist of the 2009 miniseries The Torch. Set during Dark Reign, the series opens shortly after Tom has been brought back to life by Bucky's wish. He is deeply unhappy because he is legally dead, his wife has remarried, no one seems to remember him, and the world has progressed rapidly without him. The Golden Age Vision tries to encourage him to seek a heroic path, but agrees to transport him to the Mad Thinker. Toro announces that he plans to kill the Mad Thinker for murdering him, but loses his powers before he can act on this. The Mad Thinker quickly takes him prisoner and vivisects him to learn more about his powers. He discovers that Toro is indeed a mutant, but that there are artificial cells in Toro's nervous system of exactly the same kind that make up the Human Torch. Further investigation reveals that Toro's mother, Nora Raymond, once worked for Phineas Horton, the scientist who created the Golden Age Human Torch. Still wounded, Tom is dragged to his feet to witness the Human Torch's resurrection. His friend is under the complete control of the Mad Thinker, and does not recognize him. Tom's attempt to get through to him seems only to make their captors angry, but the contact serves to reignite Tom's power.

When the Torch is being forced to destroy a small European village, Toro attempts to escape. While he was still unable to completely activate his powers, he does manage to break the device they had been using to control the Torch. The Torch returns to kill and maim everyone who tried to control him, and Tom's powers are completely activated in the resulting fire. Tom loses sight of the Torch in the melee, and flies to New York City in the hopes of finding him. There he contacts the Fantastic Four. Reed Richards confirms that the Mad Thinker was telling the truth about his powers.

Following the Infinity story, when Terrigen Mists were scattered around the world, Toro was subjected to Terrigenesis and engulfed in a cocoon. Being unknowingly an Inhuman descendant, it was now theorized that Toro's powers found their origin in his recessive Inhuman genes.<ref name="ANI8">All-New Invaders" #8 (2014). Marvel Comics.</ref>

After America is conquered by Hydra during the 2017 "Secret Empire" storyline, Toro and Jim Hammond seek help and sanctuary in Namor's realm. However, Namor had been promised Atlantis would be left alone if they cooperated and thus imprisons Toro and Hammond to turn them over to Hydra.

Benito Serrano
A new Toro appears as a member of the Young Allies. This Toro is Benito Serrano (the same identity as the Toro from Counter-Earth), but is from the "normal" Earth-616 Marvel Universe.

During the "Secret Empire" storyline, Toro appears as a member of the Underground when Hydra took over the United States.

Powers and abilities
Toro has superhuman abilities which are similar to those of the Human Torch (the ability to fly and burst into flames, as well as flame resistance). These were originally thought to be caused by his parents' exposure to radiation prior to his conception, making Toro a genetic mutant. Investigation by the Mad Thinker reveals that the similarity is because his nervous system has incorporated artificial power cells, exactly the same kind of power cells that power the original Human Torch. Reed Richards confirmed that these cells interfered with the natural expression of his mutant powers, causing him to mimic the Human Torch. Many years later, Toro's origins were retroactively changed again, to explain his powers in fact came from recessive Inhuman genes. After exposure to Terrigen Mists, he cocooned and expressed his full powers. Where previously he "subconsciously duplicated" the Human Torch's appearance, now Toro's body was composed of pink, gaseous, chemical flame. 

Toro's metabolism is enhanced when he activates his flame powers, once recovering from heart surgery within a few minutes, and once healing extensive damage inflicted by the Mad Thinker's experiments to the point that open wounds healed and scarred over in the time it took him to fly from the North Atlantic Ocean to New York City.

The second Toro has the power to change himself into a superhuman form with bull-like horns and skin, greater physical mass, superhuman strength and the ability to leap far distances.

Other versions
Before an Earth-616 counterpart appeared in the second Young Allies series, the Toro of Counter-Earth is called Benito Serrano. He is a member of the Young Allies of Counter-Earth, who can transform into a super-strong Minotaur-like humanoid (toro means "bull" in Italian and in Spanish).

In other media
 The Thomas Raymond incarnation of Toro appears in The Super Hero Squad Show episode "World War Witch!", voiced by Tara Strong. This version is a member of the Invaders.
 Benito Serrano appears in Hulk: Where Monsters Dwell'', voiced by Michael Robles while his monstrous form's vocal effects are provided by Edward Bosco. He suffers recurring nightmares about being chased through a labyrinth by a Minotaur, which Nightmare exploits to convert Serrano into an anchor and enter the mortal world, which results in Serrano being turned into an actual Minotaur. While the Hulk and Doctor Strange help break Serrano out of his nightmare, his astral form was compromised, leaving him trapped in his monstrous form. Hoping to use his newfound strength to protect people, Serrano joins the Howling Commandos while waiting for Strange to find a way to restore his normal form.

References

External links
 Toro in the Marvel Directory
 Toro in the Marvel Universe
 Toro in the Comic Book Database
 

Characters created by Carl Burgos
Comics characters introduced in 1940
Golden Age superheroes
Fictional characters with fire or heat abilities
Fictional circus performers
Fictional World War II veterans
Inhumans
Marvel Comics male superheroes
Marvel Comics mutants
Marvel Comics orphans
Marvel Comics sidekicks
Marvel Comics superheroes
Timely Comics characters